Alès Agglomération is the communauté d'agglomération, an intercommunal structure, centred on the city of Alès. It is located in the Gard department, in the Occitanie region, southern France. It was created in January 2013 by the merger of the former Communauté d'agglomération du Grand Alès with 3 former communautés de communes and 5 other communes. It was further expanded with 3 other communautés de communes in January 2017. Its seat is in Alès. Its population was 129,157 in 2017, of which 40,219 in Alès proper.

Composition
The communauté d'agglomération consists of the following 72 communes:

Alès
Anduze
Aujac
Bagard
Boisset-et-Gaujac
Bonnevaux
Boucoiran-et-Nozières
Branoux-les-Taillades
Brignon
Brouzet-lès-Alès
Castelnau-Valence
Cendras
Chambon
Chamborigaud
Concoules
Corbès
Cruviers-Lascours
Deaux
Euzet
Générargues
Génolhac
La Grand-Combe
Lamelouze
Laval-Pradel
Lézan
Les Mages
Martignargues
Le Martinet
Massanes
Massillargues-Attuech
Méjannes-lès-Alès
Mialet
Mons
Monteils
Ners
Les Plans
Portes
Ribaute-les-Tavernes
Rousson
Saint-Bonnet-de-Salendrinque
Saint-Césaire-de-Gauzignan
Saint-Christol-lès-Alès
Sainte-Cécile-d'Andorge
Sainte-Croix-de-Caderle
Saint-Étienne-de-l'Olm
Saint-Florent-sur-Auzonnet
Saint-Hilaire-de-Brethmas
Saint-Hippolyte-de-Caton
Saint-Jean-de-Ceyrargues
Saint-Jean-de-Serres
Saint-Jean-de-Valériscle
Saint-Jean-du-Gard
Saint-Jean-du-Pin
Saint-Julien-de-Cassagnas
Saint-Julien-les-Rosiers
Saint-Just-et-Vacquières
Saint-Martin-de-Valgalgues
Saint-Maurice-de-Cazevieille
Saint-Paul-la-Coste
Saint-Privat-des-Vieux
Saint-Sébastien-d'Aigrefeuille
Salindres
Les Salles-du-Gardon
Sénéchas
Servas
Seynes
Soustelle
Thoiras
Tornac
Vabres
La Vernarède
Vézénobres

References

Agglomeration communities in France
Intercommunalities of Gard